Coccidophilus is a genus of lady beetles in the family Coccinellidae. There are about five described species in Coccidophilus.

Species
These five species belong to the genus Coccidophilus:
 Coccidophilus atronitens (Casey, 1899)
 Coccidophilus cariba Gordon, 1978
 Coccidophilus marginatus (LeConte, 1878)
 Coccidophilus niger Duverger, 1986
 Coccidophilus vandenbergae González, 2012

References

Further reading

 
 

Coccinellidae
Coccinellidae genera
Articles created by Qbugbot